Lypusinae is a subfamily of moths in the Lypusidae family.

Taxonomy and systematics
 Lypusa Zeller, 1852
 Paralypusa Lvovsky, 2012

The following genera are alternatively placed elsewhere:
 Paratemelia Lvovsky, 2007
 Amphisbatis Zeller, 1870
 Pseudatemelia Rebel in Rebel & Schawerda, 1910

References

Lypusinae at funet

 
Moth subfamilies